Vulcana may refer to:

Vulcana, a Welsh strongwoman
Vulcana (river), a tributary of the Ialomița in Romania
Vulcana-Băi, a commune in Dâmbovița County, Romania
Vulcana-Pandele, a commune in Dâmbovița County, Romania
Vulcana de Sus, a village in the commune Vulcana-Băi, Dâmbovița County, Romania